Ian Pearson (born 1959) is a British politician.

Ian Pearson may also refer to:

Ian Pearson (badminton) (born 1974), English badminton player
Ian Pearson (footballer) (born 1934), Australian rules footballer